Katherine Amber Crytzer (born 1984) is a United States district judge of the United States District Court for the Eastern District of Tennessee.

Education 

Crytzer graduated from Middle Tennessee State University in 2006 with a Bachelor of Science summa cum laude. She then attended the George Mason University School of Law (now Antonin Scalia Law School), graduating in 2009 with a Juris Doctor magna cum laude.

Legal career 

Upon graduating from law school, Crytzer served as a law clerk to Judge Raymond W. Gruender of the United States Court of Appeals for the Eighth Circuit. She previously served as an Assistant United States Attorney for the Eastern District of Kentucky and was in private practice at Kirkland & Ellis. Before becoming a judge, she was the Principal Deputy Assistant Attorney General for the United States Department of Justice Office of Legal Policy, where she provided legal and policy advice to the Assistant Attorney General and Department of Justice leadership.

Withdrawn nomination to Tennessee Valley Authority 

On April 3, 2020, President Donald Trump announced his intent to nominate Crytzer to be the Inspector General of the Tennessee Valley Authority. On April 6, 2020, her nomination was sent to the Senate. She was nominated to replace Richard W. Moore, who resigned to become the United States Attorney for the Southern District of Alabama in 2017. On September 22, 2020, her nomination was withdrawn after she was nominated to become a United States district judge of the United States District Court for the Eastern District of Tennessee.

Federal judicial service 

On September 16, 2020, President Donald Trump announced his intent to nominate Crytzer to serve as a United States district judge of the United States District Court for the Eastern District of Tennessee. On September 22, 2020, her nomination was sent to the Senate. President Trump nominated Crytzer to the seat vacated by Judge Pamela L. Reeves, who died on September 10, 2020. On November 18, 2020, a hearing on her nomination was held before the Senate Judiciary Committee. On December 10, 2020, her nomination was reported out of committee by a 12–10 vote. On December 15, 2020, the United States Senate invoked cloture on her nomination by a 48–47 vote. On December 16, 2020, her nomination was confirmed by a 48–47 vote. She received her judicial commission on December 22, 2020.

References

External links 
 

1984 births
Living people
21st-century American women lawyers
21st-century American lawyers
21st-century American judges
21st-century American women judges
Antonin Scalia Law School alumni
Assistant United States Attorneys
Federalist Society members
Judges of the United States District Court for the Eastern District of Tennessee
People associated with Kirkland & Ellis
Lawyers from Washington, D.C.
Middle Tennessee State University alumni
People from Texarkana, Texas
Tennessee lawyers
Trump administration personnel
United States Department of Justice lawyers
United States district court judges appointed by Donald Trump
Virginia lawyers